DTU Campus Village is an international student housing complex found on campus at the Technical University of Denmark (DTU). The university attracts more than 700 international students a year. Campus Village houses up to 224 international students, most of them staying for the duration of a semester or an academic year. It is made up of many identical red constructions,  which house up to ten students each.
Within the village, there exists an environment of collaborative learning and cultural learning, characteristic of Erasmus+ and similar international student programs. Residents come from many different backgrounds and countries.

Origin 
DTU Campus Village was constructed in the summer of 2001, and was opened as an international student dormitory starting in fall 2001. Every unit houses 9 to 10 students. Residents staying in Campus Village may be participants of exchange or bilateral agreement programs between DTU and their home university. Many of the European students receive scholarships through the Erasmus+ program.

Location 
The cluster of container units is placed on a lot with the address Elektrovej 330. The units are arranged in rows, and they are most often called the "containers", by both residents and non-residents. Unlike most other campus buildings, Campus Village (building 330) does not have a yellow brick facade. It is instead made up of many one-story structures resembling shipping containers, painted red like the DTU logo, and each of them labeled with a letter from the alphabet.

Campus Village is located in the southwest quadrant (kvadrant 3) of the DTU Campus, in between Elektrovej and Fysikvej, and located centrally on the campus, near lecture halls, professors, and the social scene. Classrooms, administration buildings, library, computer labs, and the student bar are all found on campus, within .

Reason to study abroad 

Campus Village residents study engineering or science, as DTU is a technical university. The twenty-four DTU Msc (Master of Science) program offers a variety of English-tutored classes in  mathematics, science, computer science, environmental science, technology, and engineering. Students at Campus Village can have different levels of education completed at their home university; some come to DTU as undergraduates to gain general competence in engineering, and others are in the process of writing their master theses or working on graduate research at DTU.
A universal reason for study abroad, often more important than the technical education, is an expansion of the world view. Students hope to learn about cultures and languages different from their own. "Container life," where students come from all regions and perspectives, or the world, allows students to experience different cultures and attitudes. The Village culture that develops among the students is unique, and it enhances cultural learning and promotes collaborative community-living.

Languages 

A mix of languages is present at Campus Village. While some students with common nationalities talk to each other in their native languages, many students make an effort to learn another language. Many international students hope to learn English by studying in Denmark, as most Danes speak English from a young age. Some Campus Village residents manage to learn phrases from an additional foreign language like French or Portuguese through living with native speakers of those languages. Some students attend a class at night to learn Danish.

Cultural Learning Experience 
Most Campus Village residents are university-age students in their undergraduate or graduate years, who leave their home country to gain a deeper and wider understanding of other cultures. There is enthusiasm towards sharing of cultural beliefs and trends. Through interaction with each other—cooking together, cleaning together, talking, playing games, and watching films—students come to understand cultural differences and similarities.

Flexible Program 

Some students choose DTU as a study abroad destination because of its flexible graduate program. The programs offer a wide range of advanced technical courses. DTU has official co-operation agreements with major technical universities of the world such as the Beijing Polytechnic University and the University of Illinois, making credit transfer easy for students studying abroad.

Community 

Students at DTU Campus Village collaborate to make each other's time abroad a memorable learning experience. "Container life" is the term most often used by present and past residents to describe the campus experience. Daily container life is highlighted by several student-organized events, such as dinners, dances, BBQ in the Village, and group travels.

International Dinners 

Cooking together and sharing food are popular activities through which residents bond. Some Containers regularly cook together, and some Containers assign shifts so that one or two will cook for many. Students in a container often shop for groceries at a Fakta, Netto, or other discount stores in Lyngby. Some Containers save money by keeping a food fund together. Because of the diversity in the background of the students, Container dinners will involve cultural dishes, as well as dishes that are a mix of several cultural tastes. Past dinner events held include
 International Dinner – a potluck, where each resident or some of the residents volunteer a dish of their country
 Italian Dinner
 Sushi Night
 Moroccan Dinner
 Polish Vodka Night – Village-wide famous event during which Polish Vodka is served, as well as Pączki.
International students with off-campus housing often visit Campus Village to visit and participate in these dinners.

International students studying in Denmark are generally not offered aid to cover the cost of living expenses such as meals, accommodation, transport, books, or materials. Because they find that food items, like most everything else, are more expensive compared to in their home countries, group meals are also a way to save money on groceries.

Travel 

Students from the Containers sometimes travel together on weekends and holidays. Weekend trips may be to Copenhagen, or to other major cities of Denmark: Roskilde, Odense, etc. Scandinavian countries of Sweden, Norway, and Finland are also relatively close destinations. Popular cities to visit outside Scandinavia include Berlin, Amsterdam, Prague, and Brussels.  Some European students have cars to travel in. Non-European students may travel together, using the Eurail discount pass to travel by train.

The Buddy Programme 
Foreign exchange students at DTU have the option to have a Danish Buddy through the university's student association, in order to get better acquainted with the campus, campus life, and Danish culture. The Polyteknisk Forening (student association, or PF) sponsors the Buddy Programme, which is led by student coordinators. Buddies are Danish students who volunteer to help international students adapt to studying and living in Denmark. In exchange for their guidance and friendship, Buddies gain more insight into the life of exchange students, as well as the culture of foreign students. The Buddy Programme offers organized group events for Buddies and international students, including cultural dinners, a trip to Malmö, Sweden, a Danish Christmas or Easter Dinner, and ice skating. The Buddies are encouraged to meet weekly to talk with their students. The meetings sometimes take place during International Night at the Cellar Bar on campus, making it an environment for social and cultural exchange on Tuesdays.

Notes

External links
Technical University of Denmark
Krydsfelt (Intersect) Student Publication Magazine, DTU

Academic transfer
University and college residential buildings in Copenhagen